Sarshekaf (also Romanized as Sarshekāf) is a village in Taraznahid Rural District, in the Central District of Saveh County, Markazi Province, Iran. At the 2006 census, its population was 10, in 4 families.

References 

Populated places in Saveh County